The 2019 NCAA Division I Wrestling Championships took place from March 21 to March 23 in Pittsburgh, Pennsylvania at the PPG Paints Arena. The tournament was the 89th NCAA Division I Wrestling Championships, and featured seventy teams across that level.

Penn State won their fourth consecutive title and eighth in nine years. Two programs had their first national champions: Virginia Tech (Mekhi Lewis, who was named Outstanding Wrestler), and Rutgers (Nick Suriano and Anthony Ashnault).

Rutgers Scarlet Knights wrestling head coach Scott Goodale was named NCAA Tournament Coach of the Year.

Team results

 Note: Top 10 only
 (H): Team from hosting U.S. state

Individual results 

 Note: Table does not include wrestlebacks
 (H): Individual from hosting U.S. State

Source:

References 

2019 in sport wrestling
2019 in American sports
2019 in sports in Pennsylvania
2010s in Pittsburgh
March 2019 sports events in the United States